Tsugunai: Atonement  is a role-playing video game developed by Cattle Call for the PlayStation 2 game console. The game was published by Sony Computer Entertainment in Japan in February 2001 and was published by Atlus USA in North America in November 2001.

Story
The main character, Reise, is a Raven, a sort of mercenary who takes dangerous jobs to earn a living.  The game opens as Reise climbs an ancient tower to retrieve the Treasure Orb, a sacred artifact.  In doing so, he angers the gods, who retaliate by separating Reise's body and soul.  In order to atone for his sins, Reise must demonstrate kindness and courage by assisting the denizens of a small fishing village.  He accomplishes this by possessing the bodies of those he needs to help, in order to allow them to accomplish tasks that they will not or cannot accomplish by themselves.  In time, he ends up saving the village from a great evil.

Gameplay
The game is broken up into around 35 different quests.  Some of them involve the principal characters, while some are more peripheral and lets the player explore the lives of some of the other characters in the village.  All combat-oriented quests involve the principal characters.  Once Reise meets the quest's objective, the quest is solved and the story advances, often changing the situation in the village and opening up new quests.

Even though the game involves many different characters, the mechanics treat the characters as equal, except in the case of the weapons they can equip.  Magic, supplementary equipment, and items are carried over from quest to quest, regardless of whom Reise possesses.

Music
The musical score for Tsugunai: Atonement was written by composer Yasunori Mitsuda, better known for his earlier work on games in the Chrono series, and Xenogears. The official soundtrack, featuring enhanced instrument samples, titled an cinniùint and was released in Japan on December 25, 2001.

Reception

In Japan, Famitsu gave the game a score of 28 out of 40. Upon its release in North America, the game received "average" reviews according to the review aggregation website Metacritic.

Tsugunai: Atonement sold poorly, debuting at number 19 on the Famitsu Japanese sales chart and selling 6,261
units.

References

Notes

External links

2001 video games
Atlus games
Video games about curses
Fantasy video games
Video games about spirit possession
PlayStation 2 games
PlayStation 2-only games
Role-playing video games
Single-player video games
Sony Interactive Entertainment games
Video games scored by Yasunori Mitsuda
Video games developed in Japan
Cattle Call (company) games